Andrea Righi (born 14 December 1979) is a retired freestyle swimmer from Italy, who was a specialist in the long-distance events. He is best known for winning three medals at the 1999 Summer Universiade in Palma de Mallorca, Spain.

References
  Profile

1979 births
Living people
Italian male swimmers
Italian male freestyle swimmers
Universiade medalists in swimming
Universiade gold medalists for Italy
Universiade silver medalists for Italy
Swimmers of Centro Sportivo Carabinieri
Medalists at the 1999 Summer Universiade